Ravens Mountains is a symmetrical group of mountains on the west side of Hughes Basin in Britannia Range, Antarctica The mountains are 12 nautical miles (22 km) long and rise to 2130 m in Doll Peak. Named after the 109th Airlift Wing of the New York Air National Guard which has provided logistical support to the United States Antarctic Program (USAP) for several years beginning in 1988. Ravens is a nickname associated with the Airlift Wing.

Notable peaks
Named after Louis M. Aldi who served as the 109 Airlift Wing Command Chief Master Sergeant during the transition of Lockheed LC-130 operations from the U.S. Navy to the Air National Guard

Doll Peak is a peak rising to 2,130 metres (7,000 ft) in the northwest part of the Ravens Mountains, Britannia Range. It was named after Brigadier General Karl H. Doll, who served as Director of Operations of the 109th Tactical Airlift Group and was instrumental in early transition planning of the LC-130 operations from the U.S. Navy to the Air National Guard.[1]]

References

 

Mountain ranges of Oates Land